Metsapere may refer to:
Metsapere, Hiiu County, village in Emmaste Parish, Hiiu County, Estonia
Metsapere, Saare County, village in Lümanda Parish, Saare County, Estonia